Jerry Taff (born September 9, 1940) is an American former television anchorman for WISN-TV in Milwaukee, Wisconsin.

Early life
Taff was raised in Lamesa, Texas. And he also lived in Anadarko, Oklahoma in the 1940s. His aunt and uncle had a small grocery store south of the school. Taff was a son of Doris and E.B.Teaff. He dropped this letter "e" from his surname around 1969. He worked in his grandparents' grocery store which was named Allen's Grocery. Jerry then worked as a bookkeeper at the Cameron Lumber Company, and served in the US Air Force. His family was living in Anadarko Oklahoma from 1942 to 1945, and then they moved to Texas. In 1958 Taff graduated from Lamesa high school and then received a degree in government from Texas Tech in Lubbock in 1962.

Media career
He began working in the media at 17, when he worked at KPET in Lamesa. He went on to work at stations in New Haven, Connecticut at WTNH-TV, Flint, Michigan at WJRT-TV and Dallas at WFAA-TV. While working in Flint, Taff covered the story of a local teenager named Michael Moore who had been elected to the school board of Davison, Michigan. Taff mentored Moore and his friends for a year and a half, showing him the news business.  Moore later said of Taff: "He was the one media person in a town dominated by General Motors to have the courage to report the truth."

WISN-TV career
Taff joined WISN-TV as anchor in September 1979. He interviewed Jimmy Carter in October 1980. While working at WISN, Taff mentored reporters such as Shaun Robinson, Ben Tracy, and Jason DeRusha.  He also taught a course on journalism at Carroll University.

After serving as lead male anchor for WISN-TV for 25 years, Taff retired on May 25, 2005.
Taff was inducted into the Milwaukee Media Hall of Fame on October 23, 2009. He lives in New Braunfels, Texas.
He has two daughters DiAnn Curtis and Denise McMahan.

Controversy
Taff's parents sued him in a Waukesha County, Wisconsin court in 1985, claiming he owed them nearly $90,000. Though the lawsuit was dismissed, Taff was fired from WISN. The station later re-hired him in 1987.

References

External links

1940 births
Living people
People from Milwaukee
People from Lamesa, Texas
People from New Braunfels, Texas
Military personnel from Texas
Texas Tech University alumni
Carroll University faculty
Journalists from Texas
Journalists from Wisconsin
People from Anadarko, Oklahoma